is the second EP by the South Korean girl group Rainbow. It was released in South Korea on April 8, 2011 with "To Me" as the title track. A repackaged version of the EP was released on June 22, 2011 with the song "Sweet Dream" as the title track.

History
The cover photo for the album (and the overall concept) was spring, with the girls being photographed in white dresses while standing in a field of flowers. The tracks on their album were referred to as "luxurious, mature, feminine and sexy".

Rainbow released the teaser for their single "To Me" on April 4, 2011. The EP was released on music stores and digital music sites on April 7, 2011. The official music video was unveiled on the same day.

The song was written and produced by Daishi Dance, who produced Big Bang's hit track “Haru Haru”, and has experience producing for some of Japan's biggest names, including Ayumi Hamasaki, SMAP, and Mika Nakashima.

Some parts of the choreography were reportedly adapted from the international box office hit, “Black Swan“; and was performed by member Go Woori during the bridge.

Repackaging release
On June 22, 2011, Rainbow released a re-packaged version of their second mini-album, “To Me“, which included a new track titled “Sweet Dream”.

Rainbow released the teaser for their single "Sweet Dream" on June 20, 2011. The EP was released on music stores and digital music sites on June 22, 2011. The official music video was unveiled on the same day. The mini-album also included a new version of "Kiss", originally included on their first mini-album Gossip Girl.

On July 1, 2011 Rainbow released rehearsal video for their track, “Sweet Dream”.

Music video

To Me
It is about a girl played by Woori who finds out her true love has been seeing another women. The members are seen putting makeup and dressing up during their verses, it also alternates in between a parking lot and a boxing ring. In the end the girls spray paint the cheating lover car with the 7 colors of rainbow. It was revealed later that the guy who betrays Woori on the music video is Hyeongkon, member of the boy band A-JAX, and the another woman is former GFriend member Kim So-jeong.

Promotion
Rainbow had their comeback stage with "To Me" on Music Bank on April 8, 2011. The group also performed "To Me" on various music shows such as M! Countdown, Music Core and Inkigayo in April.
   
Rainbow had their comeback stage with "Sweet Dream" on M! Countdown on June 23, 2011. The group also performed "Sweet Dream" on various music shows such as Music Bank, Music Core and Inkigayo in June and July.

Track listing

Sweet Dream

Controversy

"Ab dance"
One month after beginning promotions for the song "A", the "belly dance" or "ab dance" featured in the music video and choreography of the song was banned from broadcast and rated +19, due to being "too sexually suggestive". The girls slowly lift up their shirts to expose their stomach in the choreography. Despite the controversy, the song was released in Japan on September 14, 2011 as their Japanese debut single.

Charts

To Me/So Girls

Album chart

Sales

Singles

Other charted songs

Total Sales

Sweet Dream

Album chart

Sales

Release history

References

External links
 
 
 
 
 

2011 EPs
Dance-pop EPs
Korean-language EPs
Rainbow (girl group) EPs
DSP Media albums